Miguel Solís may refer to:

 Miguel Solís (baseball) (1906-unknown), Cuban baseball player
 Miguel Solís (footballer) (born 1981), Colombian footballer
 Miguel Solís (racewalker), Mexican racewalker; see 2005 Pan American Race Walking Cup

See also
 Miguel Salis (born 1958), Spanish entrepreneur